The Packbow is an archery device invented by counter-terrorism author and asymmetric warfare expert Jon Perdue that was featured on season one of CNBC's Make Me a Millionaire Inventor.

Product 
The Packbow is a lightweight, portable archery device that serves as both a bow and a quiver, and features a compartment for carrying emergency equipment. It was designed to carry arrows inside, and to allow an archer to remove one arrow and shoot it without removing the others. It has a center-fire arrow rest, which eliminates or minimizes "archer's paradox" - a problem in traditional archery that requires training and practice to learn to compensate for its effects on the flight of the arrow. An early prototype, shown on "Make Me a Millionaire Inventor," also featured a bowfishing attachment and bowfishing arrow.

History 
The Packbow was invented by Jon Perdue while he was researching Latin American "collapsed societies, and what people who lived in those societies came up with to either defend themselves or to survive."

Make Me a Millionaire Inventor appearance 
Perdue appeared on the season finale of Make Me a Millionaire Inventor on September 16, 2015, and ended up accepting a deal with Kevin Smith and Marilyn Peterson of Sansegal Global for a $500,000 investment in exchange for 51 percent of the equity of the company.

References

External links 
Packbow official website

Camping equipment
American companies established in 2015
Survival equipment